Akshay Kumar Parija (born 12 May 1954) is an Indian film maker known for his depictions of Odia culture and Odissi dance in his films. Originally a banker, he currently lives in Dubai.

Life and career 
Akshay Parija presently serves as Board Member and Executive Director to Blue Lines Shipping Group which he founded in the year 2010 . Blue Lines Shipping has its operation all across the globe.  
Parija has served in Burgan Bank, Kuwait for 8 years (1983-1991), in National Bank of Oman for 7 years (1991-1998) and 12 years in BankMuscat Forex in different senior positions. He has also served in various Banks in India during his 30 years of career in banking, started from IOB (Indian Overseas Bank) at Bissam Cuttack in the 1980s.   
An Alumnus of Harvard Business School, US has studied in Utkal University and BJB College as well. Akshay Kumar Parija has schooled from Jagannathpur High School in Tiran of undivided Cuttack district.

Filmography 
Produced:

It was his experience of tribal culture in Bissam Cuttack that prompted him to produce Jiantaa Bhoota (The Living Ghost), the National Award-winning film that yet again put the limelight on Odia film Industry. Directed by Prashant Nanda, the film dealt with exploitation of environment, economy, culture in the name of industrialisation and resultant displacement, focusing on vanishing culture of Dongria Kondha tribals inhabiting the Niyamgiri Hills of Rayagada district due to mindless mining.

Both the director and producer won the National Award in 2008 from the President of India and the sensitive film that was adjudged as the 'Best Film on Protection of Environment'. This apart, Jianta Bhoota won seven- State Film Awards in various categories including the Best Film. Jianta Bhoota also bagged Best Production, Best Direction and Best Film on Social Issues at the sixth Independent South Asian Film Festival (ISAFF) in the United States.
As a culture enthusiast, Akshay Parija also holds the reputation of giving international wings to Odissi dance. For a period of over 15 years, he took Odissi onto different stages of Far East, Middle East, Europe  besides the United States. 
Thukool was his second Ollywood venture, focused on Odissi dance and portrayed the story of a dancer. Dubbed as one of the most expensive movies of 2011-12, Thukool was made at the cost of Rs 3 crore which is still the highest production cost in Odia Film Industry. Shot in exotic locations in the Middle-East, Thukool scored on locales, music, costumes and post-production. For the movie, Parija ensured the best of all elements of film-making including technicians. While post-production of Thukool was done at Chennai, some of the computer graphics were done in London. The film starred Archita Sahu, Babushaan and Pakruti Mishra. The movie went on to bag five State Film Awards besides, four ETV Cine Awards, as many Tarang Cine Awards and seven Chalachitra Jagat Awards.
His next film was Kehi Nuhen Kahar and that was followed by association with documentary feature God's Own People which dealt with the Trinity's (Lord Jagannath, Devi Subhadra, Lord Balabhadra) Nabakalebara. The 88-minute documentary was directed by Nila Madhab Panda (Padmashree Awardee) to portray the unique rituals of the Trinity that occur once in every 19 years.
Apart from Odia films, Akshay Kumar Parija had produced a number of reality talent hunt shows and tele-serials for different satellite channels. These include Sahanai for Tarang TV, Dancing Stars and Aaina for Colours Odia. Akshay Kumar Parija now plans to venture into promoting Odia music at national and international forums, here he has recently tied up with Devdas Chhotray and singer Bibhu Kishore for an album Blue Mood. While Devdas Chhotray has penned eight poems for the album, Biebhu Kishore has lent his voice to the songs. Also in the pipeline this year is Sushant Mani's much talked about Love You Jessica that Akshya Kumar Parija has produced.
He has joined hands with Nilamadhab Panda for a Hindi film titled Dark Winds that deals with climate change.

'Kadvi Hawa' deals with the most explosive subject of the world as of today- Global warming and Climatic change. The story is conceived and written by Padmashree Awardee Director Shri Nilamadhab Panda.

The movie is a positive initiative and awareness for the world of the menace of changing global climatic conditions, which affects millions across the globe.

Awards 
 56th National Film Awards, 2008, Best Film on Environment Conservation/Preservation for The Living Ghost (Jiaanta Bhoota).
 64th National Film Awards 2016 from the President of India Shri Pranab Mukherjee for the Movie "Kadvi Hawa".
 Prabasi Odia Pratibha Samman, 2011 by Non-resident Odia Facilitation Centre Bhubaneswar
 Community Service award, 2011 by Kuwait Odia Association for promoting Odia culture outside India and contribution to Odia films
 36th Annual Function & Chalachitra Jagata Pratibha Samman, 2011 for Best Film Producer for Jianta Bhoota
 Mohan Sundar Deb Goswami Awards, 2008 for Best film Jianta Bhoota
 WASITRAC Honors & Recognition for Akshay Ku Parija for his extraordinary contribution in promoting international cultures & trade 2010 by Lt. Governor Brad Owen, Space Needle, Seattle, 2010
 37th Annual Orissa Society of the Americas as Member Achievement Award.
 Special recognition film award to The Living Ghost at OMAN Green Awards 2011
 Guest of Honour & Speaker 2015, Jagannath Society Of The Americas, Nashville
 Special Recognition at 42nd Annual OSA Convention' 2011
 Appreciation for support & contribution to Prabasi Odia Samaj, Abu dhabi, 2013
 Membership Achievement Award, His role as the producer of the award-winning movie The Living Ghost, 2010, San Francisco, Bay Area, OSA
 Chitralipi Samman 2012, Best Film Jiaanta Bhoota
 6th Muscat Film Festival, Jury Award for Best Foreigner Film, The Living Ghost, 2010
 Mohan Sundar Deb Goswami Awards Best Feature Film-2015 award at State Odia Awards
 Odia Film Fair Award, 2015, Best Producer, Kehi Nuhe Kahara
 Banichitra Cine Award- 2016
 Basant Nayak Smruti Samman 2015 by Cinema Sansara
 ACRUX Showcase Odisha Awards- 2014 by Prelude Communications
 Utkal Pratibha Samman 2015
 6th Odia Film Fair Award 2015
 Cinema Duniya Award 2016
 Chalachitra Jagat Prativa Samman, 2015, Debabrata Kar Memorial Best Film Award for the film Kehi Nuhe Kahara
 Guru Gangadhar Smruti Samman, 2016, 12th Dhauli Kalinga
 Jiaanta Bhoota won record Seven State Awards, a record in Odisha

References

External links 

56th National Film Awards
64th National Film Awards

Living people
1954 births
People from Jagatsinghpur district
Film producers from Odisha
Indian television producers
Harvard Business School alumni
Producers who won the Best Film on Environment Conservation/Preservation National Film Award